Tony "Paj" Pajaczkowski (May 31, 1936 – June 4, 2022) was a Canadian professional football player. He was an all-star offensive guard in the Canadian Football League (CFL).

Coming from the Verdun Shamcats in Montreal, Pajaczkowski played 11 seasons with the Calgary Stampeders (1955–1965) and two seasons with the Montreal Alouettes (1966–1967). He was a CFL All-Star four times (1962–1965) and won the CFL's Most Outstanding Canadian Award in 1961 (after being runner-up in 1960). He was inducted into the Canadian Football Hall of Fame in 1988.

Early life and education
Pajaczkowski was born on May 31, 1936, in Verdun, Quebec. He attended Catholic High School there, and was named most valuable player of the 1953 Montreal Gazette All-Star football team. He played junior football for the Verdun Shamcats of the Quebec Rugby Football Union (QRFU) in 1954 along with former Catholic High teammate Bob Geary.

Professional career
In December 1954, Pajaczkowski and Geary were signed by the Calgary Stampeders of the Western Interprovincial Football Union (WIFU). Pajaczkowski made the roster in his first year and appeared in 12 games for the 1955 Stampeders at tackle and defensive end, mainly playing on kickoff teams. In 1956, his position was changed to guard by coach Jack Hennemier. Although initially reluctant to change, it was at this position that he became one of the all-time greats of Canadian football. In his first year at guard, Pajaczkowski earned a starting role and appeared in all 16 games as the Stampeders finished 4–12. In addition to playing at guard, he was also used by Calgary as a kicking specialist.

Pajaczkowski signed a contract extension in March 1957. Coach Otis Douglas called him one of Calgary's best Canadian prospects. He continued as starter in 1957, playing in every game as the Stampeders finished third place in the conference with a record of 6–10. On special teams, he made eight kickoffs for 391 yards, a 48.9 average.

The Vancouver Sun reported in July 1958 that Pajaczkowski was "not far behind" teammate Harry Langford as the league's most outstanding guard. He was re-signed that year and played in every game, helping Calgary to a record of 6–9–1 and a fourth-place conference finish. After playing in 14 games in 1959, Pajaczkowski was named the team's best lineman by a fan vote.

Due to pronunciation difficulties, announcer Jack Wells refused to mention Pajaczkowski's name (pronounced ) in all of the Calgary game broadcasts from 1955 to 1959.

Pajaczkowski appeared in 16 games in 1960, helping Calgary reach the second round of the WIFU playoffs. In addition to being their starting guard, he was the team's backup kickoff specialist that year, making 27 kickoffs for 1495 yards, a 55.4 yard average. He was the Stampeders' nominee for the Schenley Most Outstanding Canadian Award and was the runner-up for the honor.

In 1961, Pajaczkowski made 51 kickoffs for 2845	yards, an average of 55.8 yards per kick, and started all 16 games at guard, being named to the Western Football Conference All-Star team and earning the Most Outstanding Canadian Award.

The following year, Pajaczkowski was named for the first time of his career to the CFL All-Star team. He was one of six Stampeders to be given that honor. In 1963, he was named all-star for the second consecutive season.  He was named all-star for a third time in 1964 and in 1965 earned his fourth-straight all-star honor.

On May 19, 1966, Pajaczkowski was traded to the Montreal Alouettes. He played in all 14 games in his first year with the team. After a knee injury in a 1967 practice, he changed his position from right guard to right tackle. In a game against his former team, Calgary, Pajaczkowski was benched for the first time in his career. He announced his retirement in June 1968.

Later life and death
After retiring, Pajaczkowski accepted a position as line coach at Loyola College in Montreal.

In 1988, Pajaczkowski was inducted into the Canadian Football Hall of Fame.

Pajaczkowski lived in Port Hope, Ontario, where he died on June 4, 2022, four days after his 86th birthday.

References 

1936 births
2022 deaths
Anglophone Quebec people
Calgary Stampeders players
Canadian Football Hall of Fame inductees
Canadian Football League Most Outstanding Canadian Award winners
Canadian football offensive linemen
Canadian people of Polish descent
Montreal Alouettes players
Players of Canadian football from Quebec
Canadian football people from Montreal